The Jabbers are an American punk rock band. Perhaps best known for having GG Allin as the frontman at the beginning of his career in the late 1970s to early 1980s, many of his most well-known songs were recorded with the band, such as "Don't Talk to Me" and "Bored to Death".

One review of the only Jabbers album with Allin, Always Was, Is and Always Shall Be, states: "Amazingly enough, the violent hatred, sexual and psychological degradation, and staggering stupidity only hint at the heights (or depths) Allin would reach later."

Embryonic versions of the band appeared as early as 1977, focused around Allin (singing and occasionally playing drums), his brother Merle Allin on bass, and various local guitarists. By 1979, the live group featured bassist Alan Chapple and guitarist Rob Basso; guitarist Chris Lamy joined in 1980, and Michael O'Donnell became the group's drummer in 1983. The group disbanded in May 1984, and Allin next led The Scumfucs. Their complete recordings with Allin are on the Banned in Boston compilation.

In 2003, Chapple, Lamy, and O'Donnell reformed the band with new singer Wimpy Rutherford and lead guitarist Harlan Miller (both ex-members of the pop punk group The Queers). They released an album entitled American Standard in 2005 on Steel Cage Records.

Discography

Studio albums 
as GG Allin

as The Jabbers

Live albums 
as GG Allin & The Jabbers

Compilation albums 
as GG Allin & The Jabbers

Extended plays 
as GG Allin

as GG Allin & The Jabbers

as The Jabbers

Singles 

as GG Allin & The Jabbers

References

External links 
Official site
 Jabbers Interview by Spanky Payne of Twisted Press & The Spanky Payne Radio Show
[ Allmusic]
2006 Audio interview with The Jabbers on The NH Edge

American punk rock groups
Musical groups established in 1977
Musical groups disestablished in 1984
Musical groups reestablished in 2003
Homestead Records artists
Musical quintets
Steel Cage Records artists